Fitzhugh Mounds is an archaeological site in Madison Parish, Louisiana from the Plaquemine\Mississippian period dating to approximately 1200–1541 CE. It is the type site for the Fitzhugh Phase(1350-1500) of the Tensas Basin Plaquemine Mississippian chronology.

Description
The site was once an impressive seven-mound complex, with four of the platform mounds surrounding a central plaza. The site is first mentioned in E. G. Squier and E. H. Davis' Ancient Monuments of the Mississippi Valley in 1848.

Other of the mounds have been extensively plowed by local farmers and only two of the original seven mounds remain.

Location

See also
Culture, phase, and chronological table for the Mississippi Valley

References

External links
 Pictures of Fitzhugh Mounds
 Fitzhugh Mounds at waymarking.com

Plaquemine Mississippian culture
Mounds in Louisiana
Geography of Madison Parish, Louisiana